Tafazzal Hossain was an Indian Bengali Congress politician. He was an inaugural member of the West Bengal Legislative Assembly, representing the Kharba constituency.

Early life and family
Tafazzal Hossain was born into a Bengali Muslim family from the village of Naikunda in Malda district, Bengal Presidency.

He married Mariam Bibi, and they had a son named Mahabubul Haque Badal on 31 July 1941. Haque won the Kharba seat in the 1972 West Bengal Legislative Assembly election.

Career
Hossain won the Kharba constituency seat in the inaugural 1952 West Bengal Legislative Assembly election, standing as an Indian National Congress candidate.

References

Year of birth missing
Year of death missing
Indian National Congress politicians from West Bengal
West Bengal MLAs 1951–1957
20th-century Bengalis
People from Malda district